Longevity claims are unsubstantiated cases of asserted human longevity. Those asserting lifespans of 110 years or more are referred to as supercentenarians. Many have either no official verification or are backed only by partial evidence. Cases where longevity has been fully verified, according to modern standards of longevity research, are reflected in an established list of supercentenarians based on the work of organizations such as the Gerontology Research Group (GRG) or Guinness World Records. This article lists living claims greater than that of the oldest living person whose age has been independently verified, Spanish woman Maria Branyas, aged , and deceased claims greater than that of the oldest person ever whose age has been verified, French woman Jeanne Calment, who died at the age of 122 years and 164 days. The upper limit for both lists is 130 years.

Scientific status
Prior to the 19th century, there was insufficient evidence either to demonstrate or to refute centenarian longevity. Even today, no fixed theoretical limit to human longevity is apparent. Studies in the biodemography of human longevity indicate a late-life mortality deceleration law: that death rates level off at advanced ages to a late-life mortality plateau. This implies that there is no fixed upper limit to human longevity, or fixed maximum human lifespan.
Researchers in Denmark have found a way to determine when a deceased person was born using radiocarbon dating done on the lens of the eye.

Categorization
Guinness World Records from its inception in 1955, began maintaining a list of the verified oldest people. It developed into a list of all supercentenarians whose lifespan had been verified by at least three documents, in a standardized process, according to the norms of modern longevity research. Many unverified cases ("claims" or "traditions") have been controverted by reliable sources. Taking reliable demographic data into account, these unverified cases vary widely in their plausibility.

Fully verified claims

The oldest person verified by modern standards, and the only person with evidence to have lived to be at least 120 years of age, is French woman Jeanne Calment (21 February 1875 – 4 August 1997), aged 122 years and 164 days.
The oldest man verified by modern standards, and the only man with undisputed evidence to have lived to be over 115, is Japanese man Jiroemon Kimura (19 April 1897 – 12 June 2013), aged 116 years and 54 days.
The oldest verified living person is Spanish-American born woman Maria Branyas, born 4 March 1907, aged .

Problems in documenting 
Lucy Hannah, previously regarded as having reached age 117, had her verification removed in 2020 following the discovery of additional documents.

In numerous editions from the 1960s through the 1980s, Guinness stated thatNo single subject is more obscured by vanity, deceit, falsehood, and deliberate fraud than the extremes of human longevity.
Despite demographic evidence of the known extremes of modern longevity, stories in otherwise reliable sources still surface regularly, stating that these extremes have been exceeded. Responsible, modern, scientific validation of human longevity requires investigation of records following an individual from birth to the present (or to death); purported longevity claims far outside the demonstrated records regularly fail such scrutiny.

Actuary Walter G. Bowerman stated that ill-founded longevity assertions originate mainly in remote, underdeveloped regions, among non-literate peoples, with only family testimony available as evidence. This means that people living in areas of the world with historically more comprehensive resources for record-keeping have tended to hold more claims to longevity, regardless of whether or not individuals in other parts of the world have lived longer.

In the transitional period of record-keeping, records tend to exist for the wealthy and upper-middle classes, but are often spotty and nonexistent for the middle classes and the poor. In the United States, birth registration did not begin in Mississippi until 1912 and was not universal until 1933. Hence, in many longevity cases, no actual birth record exists. This type of case is classified by gerontologists as "partially validated".

Proximate records
Since some cases were recorded in a census or in other reliable sources, obtainable evidence may complete full verification.
Maggie Barnes: Barnes claimed to be 117 at her death on 19 January 1998. Barnes, who was born to a former slave and married a tenant farmer, had fifteen children, 11 of whom preceded her in death. Inconsistent records suggested that she was born on 6 March 1882 at the latest, but possibly a year earlier. The conclusion is that Barnes was at least 115 years and 319 days old at her death, and may have been one or two years older.

Late-life records
In another type of case, the only records that exist are late-life documents. Because age inflation often occurs in adulthood (to avoid military service or to apply for a pension early), or because the government may have begun record-keeping during an individual's lifetime, cases unverified by proximate records exist. These unverified cases are less likely to be true (because the records are written later), but are still possible. Longevity narratives were not subjected to rigorous scrutiny until the work of William Thoms in 1873. Thoms proposed the 100th-birthday test: is there evidence to support an individual's claimed age at what would be their centenary birthday? This test does not prove a person's age, but does winnow out typical pension-claim longevity exaggerations and spontaneous claims that a certain relative is over 150.
Hanna Barysevich: Barysevich claimed to have been 118. This can be neither verified nor disproven from Belarus records. The claim is demographically possible but incompletely verified. 
Pasikhat Dzhukalaeva: In 2004, The Moscow Times reported that Dzhukalayeva, of Chechnya, claimed to have been born in 1881 (age 122). The claim is possible but incompletely verified. Her death has not been reported since that time, so no age above 122 has been verifiably claimed.
Susie Brunson: Her obituaries appear in Star-News newspaper and The New York Times. Her family claimed that she was born 25 December 1870 and lived to age 123, dying in late November 1994.

Reports with complete date of birth
These are standardized lists of people whose lifespans remain unverified by proximate records, including both modern (Guinness-era) and historical cases. All cases in which an individual's supercentenarian lifespan is not (yet) backed by records sufficient to the standards of modern longevity research are listed as unverified. They may be factually true, even though records do not exist (or have not yet been found), so such lists include these grey-area cases.

Recent
These living supercentenarian cases, in descending order of claimed age, with full birth and review dates, have been updated within the past two years, but have not had their claimed age validated by an independent body such as the Gerontology Research Group or Guinness World Records. The list includes only those claims that are greater than the age of the oldest verified living person, Maria Branyas, who is currently aged , but under 130 years.

Past
This table contains supercentenarian claims with either a known death date or no confirmation for more than two years that they were still alive. Only claims greater than that of Jeanne Calment, who died at the age of 122 years, 164 days, but under 130 years are included. They are listed in order of age as of the date of death or date last reported alive.

References

External links
Books on demographic transition of longevity claims at the Max Planck Institute for Demographic Research
 of Gerontology Research Group

 
Lists of people by age
+